The Proclamation for Suppressing of Pirates may refer to:
 Either of the 1717–1718 Acts of Grace
 Other acts of grace (piracy)

Piracy law